Basim Abdullah Taeeb Al-Rajaibi (born 13 April 1992) is an Omani footballer who plays as a left back or midfielder for Omani club Al-Nahda.

International career
Basim was part of the first team squad of the Oman national football team. He was selected for the national team for the first time in 2012. He made his first appearance for Oman on 8 December 2012 against Lebanon in the 2012 WAFF Championship. He has made appearances in the 2012 WAFF Championship and has represented the nation team in the 2014 FIFA World Cup qualification and the 2015 AFC Asian Cup qualification.

Career statistics

Honours

Club
With Dhofar
Sultan Qaboos Cup: 2011
Oman Professional League Cup: 2012-13
Baniyas SC International Tournament: 2014

References

External links
 
 
 
 
 
 

1992 births
Living people
Omani footballers
People from Ad Dakhiliyah Governorate
Association football utility players
Dhofar Club players
Al-Nahda Club (Oman) players
Oman Professional League players
Oman international footballers
Footballers at the 2010 Asian Games
Asian Games competitors for Oman